Enrique Bernardo Vidallé (born 7 May 1952 in Canals, Córdoba) is a former Argentine football goalkeeper. He played for a number of clubs in Argentina and Palestino in Chile.

Vidallé came through the Boca Juniors youth system to make his professional debut in 1972, he stayed at the club until his move to Chilean team Club Deportivo Palestino in 1975. Vidallé played a number of games for the Argentina national football team including appearances at the 1979 Copa América.

Vidallé played for Gimnasia y Esgrima de La Plata in the late 70s and for their fiercest rivals Estudiantes de La Plata in the early 80s. Between 1982 and 1983 he played for Club Atlético Huracán before joining Argentinos Juniors in 1984.

Vidallé was part of the Argentinos Juniors team that won back to back league championships in the Metropolitano 1984 and the Nacional 1985. They then went on to win the Copa Libertadores 1985, with Vidallé facing a penalty shootout in the final.

Argentinos went on to play in the Intercontinental Cup in 1985 which they lost to Juventus, and in the Copa Interamericana in 1986, which they won 1-0 against Defence Force. Vidallé retired in 1987 at the age of 34.

Honours
 Argentinos Juniors
Primera División Argentina: Metropolitano 1984, Nacional 1985
Copa Libertadores: 1985
Copa Interamericana: 1985

References

External links

 Boca Juniors profile

1952 births
Living people
Sportspeople from Córdoba Province, Argentina
Argentine footballers
Argentina international footballers
1979 Copa América players
Club Deportivo Palestino footballers
Expatriate footballers in Chile
Association football goalkeepers
Boca Juniors footballers
Club de Gimnasia y Esgrima La Plata footballers
Estudiantes de La Plata footballers
Club Atlético Huracán footballers
Argentinos Juniors footballers
Argentine Primera División players
Argentine expatriate footballers
Pan American Games medalists in football
Pan American Games gold medalists for Argentina
Footballers at the 1971 Pan American Games
Medalists at the 1971 Pan American Games